Nicola Sturgeon formed the first Sturgeon government on 20 November 2014, following the resignation of previous SNP First Minister, Alex Salmond. Sturgeon, who had been Deputy First Minister under Salmond, was elected to succeed him by the SNP majority in the Scottish Parliament on 19 November 2014, before being officially sworn in in front of senior judges at the Court of Session the next day.

Sturgeon's cabinet dissolved on 18 May 2016 following the 2016 election to the 5th Scottish parliament, which saw Sturgeon returning to office and forming a second administration.

History
Following the defeat of the campaign for Scottish independence in a 2014 referendum, then First Minister Alex Salmond, who had arranged the referendum, announced that he would resign as Scottish National Party leader and first minister after a new leader was chosen. Deputy First Minister Nicola Sturgeon took the leadership unopposed at the SNP's annual conference on 14 November 2014. This also effectively made her First Minister-designate, given the SNP's outright majority in the Scottish Parliament. She was elected to succeed Salmond as First Minister by the Scottish Parliament on 19 November, and formally appointed by Queen Elizabeth II on the next day.

On 21 November 2014 Sturgeon's first cabinet was announced. It was formed of ten people: Sturgeon and nine cabinet secretaries. It was gender-balanced with five men and five women. There were thirteen junior ministerial positions outwith the cabinet.

Cabinet

November 2016 to May 2016

Changes 
 Sir Peter Housden stood down as the Permanent Secretary to the Scottish government in June 2015 and was succeeded by Leslie Evans the following month.

Junior Ministers

Scottish Law Officers

See also 
Premiership of Nicola Sturgeon

Notes

References

Scottish governments
2014 establishments in Scotland
2016 disestablishments in Scotland
Nicola Sturgeon
Ministries of Elizabeth II